The Mother's Malison or Clyde's Water is Child ballad number 216, Roud  91.

Synopsis
Willie, against his mother's advice, goes to May Margaret's home, where he is not admitted.  He drowns in the Clyde.  May Margaret wakes and says she dreamed of him.  Her mother tells her that he had been there half an hour before.  She goes after him and likewise drowns.

Recordings

Following are some of the notable recordings of the ballad, including their artists, titles, albums, and years:

See also
 List of the Child Ballads
 The Lass of Roch Royal

External links
Several variants

Child Ballads
Year of song unknown